Levaya Rossosh is a rural locality (a selo) and the administrative center of LevorosshanskoyeRural Settlement, Kashirsky District, Voronezh Oblast, Russia. The population was 1,054 as of 2018. There are 16 streets.

Geography 
Levaya Rossosh is located 18 km southwest of Kashirskoye (the district's administrative centre) by road. Starina is the nearest rural locality.

References 

Rural localities in Kashirsky District, Voronezh Oblast